Major General Cedric Maudsley Ingram "Sandy" Pearson,  (24 August 1918 – 7 November 2012) was an Australian Army officer. He was a Commander of Australian Forces during the Vietnam War, Commandant of the Royal Military College, Duntroon and Director of the Royal Agricultural Society of New South Wales.

Early life and family
CMI Pearson (known as Sandy) was born in Kurri Kurri, New South Wales, the son of Margaret and the Rev. George Ingram Pearson, a Methodist minister. Pearson attended Newington College (1932–1936) before graduating from the Royal Military College, Duntroon, in 1940.

Army career
 Served Second World War, (1942–1945)
 Served Singapore, (1966–1968)
 Commander 1st Australian Task Force, Vietnam, (1968–1969)
 Commandant, Royal Military College, Duntroon, (1970–1973)
 Chief of Personnel, Australian Army, (1973–1975)

Post army career
 Exexcutive Director, Royal Agricultural Society of NSW, (1976–1983)
 Director, Brickworks Ltd, (1983–1998)

Committees
 RSL Committees, (1977–2002)
 Newington College Council, (1978–1998)
 NSW Homeless Children, (1981–1990)

Death
Aged 94, Pearson died on 7 November 2012 at the RSL Village in Narrabeen, New South Wales.  His funeral was held eight days later at the Newington College Chapel, Stanmore.

Notes

References
 

|-

1918 births
2012 deaths
Australian generals
Australian Companions of the Distinguished Service Order
Australian military personnel of the Vietnam War
Australian Army personnel of World War II
Australian recipients of the Military Cross
Officers of the Order of Australia
Officers of the Order of the British Empire
People educated at Newington College
Members of Newington College Council
Recipients of the Gallantry Cross (Vietnam)
Recipients of the National Order of Vietnam
Royal Military College, Duntroon graduates